The Migration and Refugee Assistance Act was passed in 1962 to deal with unexpected  and urgent needs of refugees, displaced persons, conflict victims, and other persons at risk around the globe.

The Act was brought into force during the Clinton administration in 2001 to deal with the crises in the Balkans and Nepal.

The Act was cited by President Barack Obama in 2009 to authorize money up to $20.3 million related to needs of Palestinian refugees and conflict victims in Gaza.

External links
 MEMORANDUM: Migration and Refugee Assistance Act of 1962 

United States federal immigration and nationality legislation
1962 in American law